Katrina Patchett (born 12 December 1986) is a professional ballroom dancer from Perth, Western Australia.

Early life
She has been dancing since the age of three and competing since the age of seven.  She was brought up in her mother (Julie Patchett)'s dance studio in Perth, Western Australia, daughter of two internationally successful ballroom dancers who reached seventh in the world. At age thirteen she became a Western Australian State Champion.

Career
Patchett moved to Europe at the age of 16, living, training and working in Denmark (partnering with Joachim Dahlström) before moving to France, at 19, to partner with the former winner of The Dancing Show, Maxime Dereymez. Together in 2007, they became the French national champions.   The couple also reached fourth place at the IDSF Open in 2007. After three years in France, Patchett moved to Slovenia to dance with Blaz Pocajt and compete in the professional category at the age of 22. Towards the end of 2010, Dereymez and Patchett decided to renew their partnership.  They both competed on TF1's Danse avec les stars. Patchett won the first season of Danse avec les stars with her partner French singer/songwriter, Matt Pokora, on 19 March 2011.

Patchett speaks French, and lives in Paris.

Danse avec les stars

Celebrity partners

DWTS Australia

References

Living people
1986 births
Australian ballroom dancers
Modern dance
Australian expatriates in France
People from Perth, Western Australia
Danse avec les stars winners
21st-century Australian dancers